Treloar's Hospital Platform (also known as Alton Park and Cripples' Home Siding) was a railway station which served Lord Mayor Treloar's hospital in Alton, Hampshire, England.

History
The station was built by the London and South Western Railway no earlier than 5 April 1910 on the route of the Basingstoke and Alton Light Railway. It was opened , and was a private station, used by parties of children visiting Lord Mayor Treloar's Cripples Home, which had opened in 1908. The station was known under three names: Cripples' Home Siding (until at least 1929); Alton Park and Treloar's Hospital Platform.

The station was closed in 1939 by the Southern Railway. The platform/line was used for goods traffic until 1967.

References

Disused railway stations in Hampshire
Former London and South Western Railway stations
Railway stations in Great Britain opened in 1918
Railway stations in Great Britain closed in 1939
Alton, Hampshire